Pandhurli is a village and a municipal council in Sinnar taluka of Nashik district in the Indian state of Maharashtra.

Geography
Pandhurli (Marathi-पांढुर्ली) is located at  It has an average elevation of 562 metres (1843 feet). It lies 23 km southeast of Nashik city on the Nagpur–Aurangabad–Mumbai  Highway.

Demographics
 India census, Pandhurli had a population of 4,500.

References

Villages in Nashik district